Anthony Long may refer to:
A. A. Long (Anthony Arthur Long, born 1937), classical scholar
Anthony Long (footballer), Australian rules footballer for Essendon
Anthony Long (police officer), British police marksman